Beldon Katleman (July 14, 1914 – September 28, 1988) was an American businessman. Katleman was the owner of El Rancho Vegas, a hotel casino in Las Vegas, Nevada, where he invented the buffet for guests. The El Rancho Vegas was the first full service hotel casino built on the Las Vegas Strip. The El Rancho Vegas opened in 1941.  Katleman was an investor in two other Las Vegas casinos, the Frontier Hotel and the Silver Slipper.

Early life
Beldon Katleman was born to an affluent Jewish family on July 14, 1914 in Iowa. He graduated from the University of California, Los Angeles. His parents owned the Circle K national chain of parking lots and owned real estate in Los Angeles. During World War II, Katleman served as a lieutenant in the motion picture division of the Signal Corps in the U.S. Army.

Career
From the late 1940s until it was destroyed by a fire in 1960, he owned and operated El Rancho Vegas in Las Vegas, Nevada. In an effort to keep patrons in his casino, Katleman came up with the idea of the buffet in 1947.

With Guy McAfee and Jake Kozloff, Katleman acquired the Frontier Hotel from Bill Moore for US$5.5 million in 1951. He succeeded Kozloff as its manager in 1955.

Katleman was an investor in the Silver Slipper, another casino in Las Vegas, alongside Jack Barenfeld, Norma Friedman, Irving Leff and T.W. Richardson. After leasing it to Howard Hughes since 1968, they sued Hughes over a year's unpaid rents in 1974.

In April 1988, the Senate Revenue and Taxation Committee Senate reviewed the "murky" settlement of taxes Katleman may have owed to the state of California in the 1960s.

Personal life
In January 1941, Katleman married Leonore Cohn, whom he had met at the Hillcrest Country Club, the Jewish golf club in Los Angeles; Leonore was the niece of Columbia Pictures founder Harry Cohn. In 1942, They had a daughter named Diane Katleman Deshong. They resided in Beverly Hills, California. The couple separated in 1944 and divorced soon after; she married Lewis Rosenstiel in 1946.

Death
Katleman died on September 28, 1988 in Los Angeles, California. He was buried at the Hillside Memorial Park Cemetery in Culver City, California.

References

External links

1914 births
1988 deaths
People from Beverly Hills, California
Businesspeople from Las Vegas
University of California, Los Angeles alumni
American casino industry businesspeople
American hoteliers
20th-century American Jews
20th-century American businesspeople
Annenberg family